Setareh Pesyani (born September 8, 1985) is an Iranian actress. She has won an Honorary Diploma at the 39th Fajr Film Festival and an Urban International Film Festival Award for her performance in the war drama Yadoo (2021).

Career 
Setareh Pesyani is daughter of Atila Pesyani, the famous Iranian actor. Her debut happened when she was 5 years old, in a play directed by her father. She has directed the play of ‘Magic Musical Instrument’ (1995), when she was 13. In 1991, she entered cinema by acting in World's Greatest Dad. She has played in several movies and series such as Unfinished Narrations (2006), Three Women (2007), The Third Wave (2008), Office No.13 (2009), and No Men Allowed (2011). She has won Best Actress Award of The 28th Fajr Theater Festival for playing in The House (2009) play.

Filmography

Film

Web

Television

References

1982 births
Living people
People from Tehran
Actresses from Tehran
Iranian film actresses
Iranian stage actresses
Iranian television actresses
21st-century Iranian actresses